Ante Vrčić (born 7 June 1934) is a Croatian rower. He competed in the men's coxed pair event at the 1960 Summer Olympics.

References

1934 births
Living people
Croatian male rowers
Olympic rowers of Yugoslavia
Rowers at the 1960 Summer Olympics
Sportspeople from Šibenik